Jacques Delarüe-Caron de Beaumarchais (1913 - 1979) was French Ambassador to the United Kingdom from 1972 until 1977.

Honours 
  Commandeur, Légion d'honneur (1976)
  Commandeur, Ordre national du Mérite (1968)

See also 
 List of Ambassadors of France to the United Kingdom

Notes

1913 births
1979 deaths
University of Paris alumni
École nationale d'administration alumni
20th-century French diplomats
Ambassadors of France to the United Kingdom
Commanders of the Ordre national du Mérite
Commandeurs of the Légion d'honneur